Kathleen Rebecca Cuthbert (6 February 1925 – 7 January 2017) was a British diver. She competed in the women's 3 metre springboard event at the 1948 Summer Olympics.

References

1925 births
2017 deaths
British female divers
Olympic divers of Great Britain
Divers at the 1948 Summer Olympics
People from Willesden